USS LSM-19 was a  in the United States Navy during World War II. She was later sold to South Korean Navy as ROKS Girin (LSM-610).

Construction and career 
LSM-19 was laid down on 24 April 1944 at Brown Shipbuilding Co., Houston, Texas. Launched on 14 May 1944 and commissioned on 15 June 1944.

Service in the United States 
During World War II, LSM-19 was assigned to the Asiatic-Pacific theater. She took part in the Leyte landing from 20 October to 29 November 1944 and the Ormoc Bay landings from 7 to 8 December 1944. During her Leyte landing, one of the ship's crew was killed which earned him a Purple Heart on 23 October 1944.

She participated in the Lingayen Gulf landing from 16 to 18 January 1945, Mariveles-Corregidor from 14 to 28 February 1945, Mindanao Island landings on several occasions (10 March 1945, 17 to 23 April 1945, and 10 to 16 May 1945) and Balikpapan Operations from 26 June to 6 July 1945.

LSM-19 was decommissioned on 1 July 1946 at Astoria, Oregon and was put into the Columbia River Pacific Reserve Fleet following the end of her service and later loaned to South Korea.

She was struck from the Navy Register.

Service in South Korea 
ROKS Girin was acquired by the South Korean Navy on 3 July 1956 and was commissioned on an unknown date.

Later in her service, she was designated as LSM-658.

She participated in the Team Spirit 1991 and carried South Korean M48 Patton tanks.

She was decommissioned on 28 February 1999 and her fate is unknown.

Awards 
LST-19 have earned the following awards:
American Campaign Medal
Asiatic-Pacific Campaign Medal (5 battle stars)
Combat Action Ribbon
Philippines Liberation Medal (2 awards)
Philippines Presidential Unit Citation 
World War II Victory Medal

Citations

Sources

External links

World War II amphibious warfare vessels of the United States
Ships built in Houston
1944 ships
LSM-1-class landing ships medium
Ships transferred from the United States Navy to the Republic of Korea Navy